A Man of Mayfair is a 1932 British musical comedy film directed by Louis Mercanton and starring Jack Buchanan, Joan Barry and Warwick Ward.

Production
It was made at British and Dominions Elstree Studios by the British subsidiary of Paramount Pictures. he film's sets were designed by the art director Holmes Paul. Buchanan had recently made the hit Monte Carlo for Paramount in Hollywood and came to Britain to appear in this film which Paramount put larger resources into rather than other American companies who produced quota quickies. Shortly afterwards he was signed up by Herbert Wilcox and appeared in several films for him during the decade beginning with Goodnight, Vienna (1932).

Cast
Jack Buchanan as Lord William
Joan Barry as Grace Irving
Warwick Ward as Ferdinand Barclay
Nora Swinburne as Elaine Barclay
Ellaline Terriss as Old Grace
Lilian Braithwaite as Lady Kingsland
Cyril Raymond as Charles
Charles Quatermaine as Dalton
Sebastian Smith as Macpherson
J. Fisher White as Wilson

References

Bibliography
Low, Rachael. Filmmaking in 1930s Britain. George Allen & Unwin, 1985.
Wood, Linda. British Films, 1927-1939. British Film Institute, 1986.

External links

British musical comedy films
1932 musical comedy films
Paramount Pictures films
British black-and-white films
Films directed by Louis Mercanton
Films set in London
Films shot at Imperial Studios, Elstree
1932 films
Films scored by Percival Mackey
1930s English-language films
1930s British films